Alice Au Yin-ching is a Chinese actress from Hong Kong. Au was active in the late 1960s.

Career 
In 1967, Au started her acting career in Hong Kong. Au first appeared in Terrors Over Nothing, a 1967 Cantonese martial arts film directed by Chiang Wai-Kwong. Au's last Hong Kong film was Apartment for Ladies, a 1970 Mandarin comedy film directed by Umetsugu Inoue.

Filmography

Films 
 1967 Terrors Over Nothing
 1967 The Black Killer
 1967 The Black And The White Cats
 1967 The Golden Cat 
 1967 Lady Black Cat Strikes Again
 1969 Miss Fragrance 
 1970 Apartment for Ladies - Ting Lien 
 1970 Vengeance!

References

External links

HK Cinemagic entry

Alice Au
Possibly living people
Year of birth missing (living people)